Andrice Arp (born 1969 in Los Angeles) is a U.S. comics artist and illustrator, and the daughter of Halton Arp. She has been a contributor to the self-published comic Hi-Horse. In 2004, Hi-Horse Omnibus, comprising all new material, was published by Alternative Comics. Arp also contributed to the comics anthology Mome.

In September 2006, Arp's work was featured in an exhibit at the Cartoon Art Museum in San Francisco, as well as a museum in New York.

Her illustrations have appeared in Shout magazine, Kitchen Sink magazine, and The New York Times. Arp has illustrated three covers of Scram, a Journal of Unpopular Culture (issues #1, #10 and #20). She also works as an illustrator for the book-swapping web site BookMooch, restaurant-music provider MoodMixes, and audio engineering company ToneGnome.

Notes

References

External links
 Hi-Horse website
 BookMooch illustration
 MoodMixes illustration
 ToneGnome illustration

Artists from Los Angeles
Cornell University alumni
American female comics artists
Living people
1969 births